The Logan County Courthouse is a historic Second Empire building located on the southeastern corner of Main Street and Columbus Avenue in downtown Bellefontaine, Ohio, United States.  Built in 1870 at a cost of $105,398.08, the courthouse was constructed primarily of locally mined sandstone, and it is covered with a mansard roof.  The courthouse is adjacent to Court Avenue, the first concrete street in the United States.

On June 4, 1973, it was added to the National Register of Historic Places.

References

Courthouses on the National Register of Historic Places in Ohio
Buildings and structures in Logan County, Ohio
National Register of Historic Places in Logan County, Ohio
County courthouses in Ohio
Government buildings completed in 1870
Sandstone buildings in the United States
U.S. Route 68
Second Empire architecture in Ohio
Clock towers in Ohio
Bellefontaine, Ohio